Hypochnicium is a genus of corticioid fungi in the family Meruliaceae. The genus was circumscribed by mycologist John Eriksson in 1958.

Species
Hypochnicium albostramineum (Bres.) Hallenb. (1985)
Hypochnicium aotearoae B.C.Paulus, H.Nilsson & Hallenb. (2007)
Hypochnicium bombycinum (Sommerf.) J.Erikss. (1958)
Hypochnicium capitulatum Boidin & Gilles (2000)
Hypochnicium caucasicum Parmasto (1967)
Hypochnicium cremicolor (Bres.) H.Nilsson & Hallenb. (2003)
Hypochnicium cymosum (D.P.Rogers & H.S.Jacks.) K.H.Larss. & Hjortstam (1977)
Hypochnicium cystidiatum Boidin & Gilles (1971)
Hypochnicium eichleri (Bres. ex Sacc. & P.Syd.) J.Erikss. & Ryvarden (1976)
Hypochnicium erikssonii Hallenb. & Hjortstam (1990)
Hypochnicium flexibile (G.Cunn.) Gorjón & Gresl. (2012)
Hypochnicium geogenium (Bres.) J.Erikss. (1958)
Hypochnicium globosum Sheng H.Wu 1990)
Hypochnicium gomezii S.E.López & J.E.Wright (1985)
Hypochnicium guineense Tellería, M.Dueñas, Melo & M.P.Martín (2010)
Hypochnicium horridulum (Rick) Baltazarr & Rajchenb. (2016)
Hypochnicium huinayensis Tellería, M.Dueñas & M.P.Martín (2013)
Hypochnicium longicystidiosum (S.S.Rattan) Hjortstam & Ryvarden (1984)
Hypochnicium lundellii (Bourdot) J.Erikss. (1958)
Hypochnicium lyndoniae (D.A.Reid) Hjortstam (1995)
Hypochnicium michelii Tellería, M.Dueñas, Melo & M.P.Martín (2010)
Hypochnicium multiforme (Berk. & Broome) Hjortstam (1998)
Hypochnicium novae-zelandiae (G.Cunn.) Gorjón & Gresl. (2012)
Hypochnicium odontioidescens Boidin & Gilles (2000)
Hypochnicium patagonicum Gorjón & Hallenb. (2013) – Chile
Hypochnicium pini Y.Jang & J.J.Kim (2013) – East Asia
Hypochnicium pseudoprosopidis Boidin & Gilles (2000)
Hypochnicium punctulatum (Cooke) J.Erikss. (1958)
Hypochnicium sphaerosporum (Höhn. & Litsch.) J.Erikss. (1958)
Hypochnicium stratosum Burds. & Nakasone (1983)
Hypochnicium subrigescens Boidin (1971)
Hypochnicium wakefieldiae (Bres.) J.Erikss. (1958)

References

Taxa described in 1958
Meruliaceae
Polyporales genera